A bibliography of the published works of Roger Angell, American writer and editor.

Books

, about the New York Yankees pitcher David Cone
, introduction by Richard Ford

Essays, reporting and other contributions

 
 Foreword,

List of poems 

Bibliographies by writer
Bibliographies of American writers